William Charles Davies (28 February 1881 – 18 August 1962) was a Welsh international footballer who played as an outside forward for Crystal Palace, Shrewsbury Town, Stoke, West Bromwich Albion and the Wales national team.

Career
Davies was born in Newtown and played for Rhayader, Llandrindod, Knighton and Shrewsbury Town before he joined Stoke in 1905. He played 17 times for Stoke in two seasons scoring once against Preston North End on the final day of the 1906–07 which saw Stoke suffer relegation. He then spent a season with Crystal Palace before playing over 50 matches for West Bromwich Albion. He returned to Palace in 1910 and went on to play 162 times in five years.

He was capped on four occasions by the Wales national football team. His first cap came in March 1908 when he became Crystal Palace's first current international player.

Career statistics

Club

International
Source:

References

1880s births
1960 deaths
Welsh footballers
Association football outside forwards
Wales international footballers
Crystal Palace F.C. players
Shrewsbury Town F.C. players
Stoke City F.C. players
West Bromwich Albion F.C. players
English Football League players
Southern Football League players